Lynch The Weirdo is the title of the second full-length album by the metal band Bad Acid Trip, released on April 20, 2004. It was produced by System of a Down member Daron Malakian.

Track listing

Personnel
Bad Acid Trip
 Dirk Rogers — vocals
 Keith Aazami — guitars, banjos, vocals
 Chris Mackie — bass
 Jose Perez — drums

Production
Daron Malakian - Producer
Tobias Miller - Engineer, Mixing
Miles Wilson - Assistant Engineer
Tim Harkins - Mixing
Paul Miner - Mastering
George Tonikian - A&R Management
Nick John - Artist Management
Sarah Remetch - Lynching Photo
Bobby Aazami - Band Photo
Virginie Parant - Legal
Heidi Ellen Robinson Fitzgerald - Publicist
Andrew Goodfriend - U.S. Booking

References

2004 albums
Serjical Strike Records albums
Bad Acid Trip albums
Albums produced by Daron Malakian
Albums recorded at Sound City Studios